Gordon William Harris (born 19 February 1945) is a Scottish former professional footballer who played as a full back.

Career
After playing junior football for Luncarty, Harris began his senior career with Forfar Athletic. His performances attracted attention from several Football League sides and, in March 1965, Cardiff City manager Jimmy Scoular paid £2,000 to sign him. He played five league matches but was released by the club at the end of the season, giving up professional football to become a trainee architect.

References

1945 births
Living people
Scottish footballers
Luncarty F.C. players
Forfar Athletic F.C. players
Cardiff City F.C. players
English Football League players
Association football fullbacks